HMAS Lithgow (J206/M206), named for the city of Lithgow, New South Wales, Australia was one of 60 Bathurst-class corvettes constructed during World War II, and one of 36 initially manned and commissioned solely by the Royal Australian Navy (RAN).

Design and construction

In 1938, the Australian Commonwealth Naval Board (ACNB) identified the need for a general purpose 'local defence vessel' capable of both anti-submarine and mine-warfare duties, while easy to construct and operate. Construction of the prototype  did not go ahead, but the plans were retained. The need for locally built 'all-rounder' vessels at the start of World War II saw the "Australian Minesweepers" (designated as such to hide their anti-submarine capability, but popularly referred to as "corvettes") approved in September 1939, with 60 constructed during the course of the war: 36 (including Lithgow) ordered by the RAN, 20 ordered by the British Admiralty but manned and commissioned as RAN vessels, and 4 for the Royal Indian Navy.

Lithgow was laid down by Morts Dock & Engineering Co at Mort's Dock in Balmain, New South Wales on 19 August 1940. She was  launched on 21 December 1940, and commissioned into the RAN on 14 June 1941.

Operational history

In May 1943, Lithgow was one of several ships to search for survivors following the torpedoing of AHS Centaur, with no success.

The corvette received three battle honours for her wartime service: "Darwin 1942", "Pacific 1941–45", and "New Guinea 1942–44".

Fate
Lithgow paid off to reserve on 8 June 1948 and was sold for scrap to the Hong Kong Delta Shipping Company on 8 August 1956.

Citations

References
Books

Journal and news articles

External links

Bathurst-class corvettes of the Royal Australian Navy
Ships built in New South Wales
1940 ships
World War II corvettes of Australia